The sixth and final season of House of Cards, an American political drama television series created by Beau Willimon for Netflix, was released on November 2, 2018. Frank Pugliese and Melissa James Gibson returned as showrunners for the final season. The sixth season continues the story of recently-inaugurated, Democratic president Claire Underwood (Robin Wright), who faces new threats within and outside the White House following the death of her husband and former president Frank Underwood. Powerful elites, led by wealthy siblings Annette and Bill Shepherd (Diane Lane and Greg Kinnear), are attempting to manipulate and destroy her presidency, while Claire struggles to exert influence and escape her husband's shadow.

The sixth season marks the first of the series without Kevin Spacey, who portrayed lead character Frank Underwood. Soon after production began in October 2017, Netflix fired the actor as a result of sexual misconduct allegations made against him. Production was halted for several months while the screenplay was reworked to exclude Spacey's character. As a result, the season was reduced to eight episodes, deviating from the 13-episode format of the previous seasons.

Production

Unannounced start and sudden shutdown

On October 11, 2017, The Baltimore Sun reported that House of Cards had been renewed for a sixth season and that filming would begin by the end of October 2017. On October 18, 2017, production of the sixth season of House of Cards appeared to be already in progress, without an official renewal announcement by Netflix, when a gunman opened fire near a House of Cards set outside Baltimore. Production company Media Rights Capital and Netflix stated that production on the show was not affected by the shooting.

Production on the series was shut down on October 30, 2017, following sexual assault allegations towards Kevin Spacey by actor Anthony Rapp, who publicly stated that Spacey had made a sexual advance on him in 1986, when Rapp was 14 years old. Netflix announced its decision to cancel the series after the upcoming season, although multiple sources stated that the decision to end the series had been made prior to Rapp's accusation.

The following day, Netflix and MRC announced that production on the season would be suspended indefinitely, in order to review the current situation and to address any concerns of the cast and crew. Robin Wright strongly opposed Netflix executives who wanted to cancel the season, as she was concerned about the 2,500 people who had been involved in the production at that time and were at risk of losing their jobs. On November 3, 2017, Netflix announced that they would no longer be associated with Spacey in any capacity whatsoever.

Restarting production

On December 4, 2017, Ted Sarandos, Netflix's chief content officer, announced that production would restart in 2018 with Wright in the lead, without Spacey's involvement, and revealed that the sixth and final season of the show would consist of eight episodes. House of Cards resumed production on January 31, and wrapped filming four months later, on May 25, 2018.

The firing of Kevin Spacey significantly affected the production process, as showrunners Frank Pugliese and Melissa Gibson had to rethink the show and come up with a conclusion for the series in a limited amount of time, taking into consideration other contractual obligations of the cast and crew. In an interview with IndieWire, Pugliese and Gibson revealed that these changes did not represent a huge shift for many of the characters; it was the overall story that was mostly affected, which was initially intended to center on a struggle between Frank and Claire to own the White House. The showrunners also revealed that—even in his absence—Frank continues to have a big impact on the story, and noted that erasing him completely would have seemed disingenuous.

In the wake of Spacey's firing, Wright leads the sixth season of House of Cards, with her character, Claire Underwood, having assumed the presidency at the end of the previous season. A number of returning cast members reprised their roles from previous seasons, while Alik Sakharov, who had helmed three episodes in season five, directed for the final season as well. New additions to the cast included Diane Lane and Greg Kinnear, who played Annette and Bill Shepherd, the sister-brother inheritors of an industrial conglomerate; said characters were inspired by the Koch brothers, as members of a family with the power to influence American politics. Joining them, Australian actor Cody Fern plays Annette's ambitious son Duncan Shepherd. Lane had been cast to play Claire's longtime friend prior to the firing of Spacey, with whom she had shot a number of scenes. However, as she told IndieWire, the writers "managed to find the same trajectory for [her] character in terms of what she means to Claire."

Cast and characters

Main

 Robin Wright as President Claire (Hale) Underwood 
 Michael Kelly as Douglas "Doug" Stamper 
 Diane Lane as Annette Shepherd 
 Campbell Scott as Vice President Mark Usher 
 Derek Cecil as Seth Grayson 
 Cody Fern as Duncan Shepherd 
 Athena Karkanis as Melody Cruz 
 Jeremy Holm as FBI Assistant Director Nathan Green 
 Greg Kinnear as Bill Shepherd 
 Boris McGiver as Tom Hammerschmidt 
 Constance Zimmer as Janine Skorsky 
 Kristen Sieh as Press Secretary Kelsey Stewart 
 Patricia Clarkson as Jane Davis 
 Jayne Atkinson as Catherine "Cathy" Durant

Recurring

 Boris Kodjoe as Congressman, later Speaker of the House Brett Cole 
 Linda Marie Larson as Jennifer Baumgarten 
 Linda Powell as Secretary of State Marcy Siegerson 
 Chip Zien as Dr. Charles Rosen 
 Brian Keane as Ray Meyers 
 Susan Pourfar as Secretary of Homeland Security Nora Cafferty 
 Ron Canada as Judge Vincent Abruzzo 
 Lars Mikkelsen as President Viktor Petrov 
 Gregg Edelman as Stan Durant

Guest

 Chris Agos as USSS Special Agent Rick Bowman 
 Robert Newman as EPA Administrator 
 Joy Lynn Jacobs as U.S. Attorney 
 Lee Sellars as Governor of Ohio Roger Olmstead 
 Aaron Serotsky as Russell 
 Darwin Shaw as Rafiq Nasser 
 Sakina Jaffrey as Linda Vasquez 
 John Ellison Conlee as a hunter 
 Thomas Kopache as Earl Hanna 
 Marc Kudisch as Henry Mitchell 
 Willa Fitzgerald as 20-year-old Claire 
 Ali Collier as teenager Claire 
 David Corenswet as Reed 
 Kenneth Tigar as Walter Doyle

Episodes

Marketing

From March to October 2018, Netflix released various promotional material for the sixth and final season of House of Cards. On March 4, the first teaser premiered during the 90th Academy Awards ceremony. The teaser shows Robin Wright in the Oval Office as President Claire Underwood, declaring "We're just getting started," followed by an intertitle reading "Hail to the Chief". On June 10, Netflix released two first-look images from the final season. The first photo shows Wright listening to director Alik Sakharov, and the second shows her looking straight at the camera. On July 4, the 242nd anniversary of the adoption of the Declaration of Independence, a video message was posted on House of Cards official Twitter account, with President Claire Underwood saying, "Happy Independence Day... to me." The message is followed by the hashtag #MyTurn.

On August 7, Netflix announced that the season would be released on November 2, 2018, and unveiled key art. The poster pays homage to the promotional image for the first season of the series, as Wright strikes the Lincoln Memorial pose, like Kevin Spacey had done before her. On August 27, four images were published via a press release, which depict new cast members Diane Lane, Greg Kinnear and Cody Fern in their roles as members of the Shepherd family. A teaser trailer released on September 5, revealed the fate of Frank Underwood, portrayed by Spacey who was fired from the show, months after the conclusion of the fifth season. It is shown that Frank died in 2017, and has been buried next to his father in South Carolina. Claire visits her husband's grave and says, "I'll tell you this though, Francis. When they bury me, it won't be in my backyard. And when they pay their respects, they'll have to wait in line." This speech mirrors the one Frank gives in the third season of the series, when he visits his father's grave. On September 27, Netflix released a new teaser trailer that presents several new and returning characters. Claire is shown dealing with the aftermath of her husband's death, and declaring that "the reign of the middle-aged white man is over." On October 8, Netflix released the official trailer for the season, which revolves around Claire's power struggle, as she clashes with the American oligarchs and tries to forge her own path as President of the United States. On October 23, critics began publishing reviews on the season, based on advance copies of the first five episodes that they had received from Netflix, after they had signed a letter of agreement.

Reception

Critical response
Prior to the official release date of the season, Netflix sent the first five episodes to a number of critics, to serve as advance screeners. On Rotten Tomatoes, the season has an approval rating of 69% based on 64 reviews, with an average rating of 6.11/10. The consensus reads, "House of Cards folds slightly under the weight of its labyrinthian ending – thankfully Robin Wright's commanding performance is strong enough to keep it standing strong." On Metacritic, the season has a weighted average score of 62 out of 100, based on 21 critics, indicating "generally favorable reviews".

Kevin Lever of FilmEra wrote that "with Wright at the forefront of the show now, House of Cards shines as it did in its early years." Lever described the production as "stellar" and the writing as "reinvigorated". He noted that the show still has the feel of previous years, but it works best when it focuses on Claire, instead of dealing with holdover pieces. David Zurawik of The Baltimore Sun wrote, "I love TV drama that speaks to the cultural moment the way this series does. And, as I have said over and over, #MeToo is a landmark moment." Zurawik revealed that the season primarily focuses on gender issues; "the evil of patriarchy and the stench of misogyny". He stated that the episodes exceeded his expectations, and praised the performances of Wright, Lane and Kinnear. Christopher Hooton of The Independent described the episodes as "slightly banal". He expressed his disappointment at the new characters that were introduced this season, and commented that "Frank Underwood has left behind not only a power vacuum but an entertainment one." Hooton noted that ever since Frank became president at the end of season two, the series has drifted directionless, and after watching the first five episodes of the final season, it still remains unclear what the show is actually about.

Negative reviews include one by Tyler Coates of Esquire, who writes: "Kevin Spacey's absence haunts the final season of House of Cards. Just as the show wouldn't work without Claire Underwood, it doesn't exactly work without Frank." Another by Sonia Saraiya of Vanity Fair writes: "House of Cards collapses – finally. Down a star and out of things to say, Season 6 flounders." Jack Seale of The Guardian rated the season two stars out of five stating, "We still need to talk about Kevin. It's impossible not to miss Spacey's presence as Robin Wright struggles to make her mark and save Netflix's first big show."

The series finale in particular was met with largely negative reviews.  Scott Von Doviak of The A.V. Club gave the episode a "C−", praising Wright's direction but criticizing the writing and the characterization of Claire during the final season. Kyle Fowle of Entertainment Weekly gave the episode a "D" rating, saying the ultimate flaw of the season and the finale was the large focus on Frank and Frank's legacy. Emily VanDerWerff of Vox gave the finale a one-and-a-half star rating out of five, saying the season "saved the worst for last".

Accolades
For the 71st Primetime Emmy Awards, Robin Wright and Michael Kelly received nominations for Outstanding Lead Actress in a Drama Series and Outstanding Supporting Actor in a Drama Series, respectively.

References

External links

2018 American television seasons
House of Cards (American TV series) seasons